This is a list of media outlets in the city of Lethbridge, Alberta, Canada.

Radio

Television

Lethbridge previously received CBC Television from a rebroadcaster of CBRT-DT in Calgary, and Ici Radio-Canada Télé from a rebroadcaster of CBXFT-DT in Edmonton. However, these repeaters went off the air on August 31, 2012 due to budget cuts. Most Lethbridge residents didn't lose access to CBC or Radio-Canada programming, however, as they are still carried on cable.

The incumbent cable television provider in Lethbridge is Shaw Cable. Network programming from the United States is received on cable via affiliates from Spokane, Washington, which is in the Pacific Time Zone. This means American prime time shows on weekdays run from 9PM–12 midnight. Also, except for PBS, HDTV network programming is from Seattle. On digital cable, U.S. network programming (in standard resolution) is available from Detroit in the Eastern Time Zone. Prime time shows on weekdays run from 6PM-9PM.

Newspapers
 The Endeavour - weekly, produced by the advertising/public relations and print journalism students at Lethbridge College
 Lethbridge Herald - daily paper, owned by Glacier Ventures International Corp. and Alta Newspaper Group Limited Partnership
 Lethbridge Journal -  Former weekly paper, published by Lethbridge Herald
 Lethbridge Sun Times - weekly paper, published by Lethbridge Herald
 The Meliorist - weekly, independent student newspaper at the University of Lethbridge

See also
 List of Calgary media outlets

Lethbridge
Media, Lethbridge